Jean Dieudonné Deneux (bef. 17491786) was a painter from Liège, current Belgium. He is most notable for his flower paintings.

Deneux's father, Henri Deneux, apprenticed Dieudonné to the atelier of "Coclers" (probably Jean-Georges-Christian Coclers) for three years on 15 August 1749.

Sources

18th-century painters from the Prince-Bishopric of Liège
1786 deaths